João Goulart Filho's presidential campaign in 2018 was made official on August 5, 2018 having as vice president Léo Alves, a professor of Catholic University of Brasília. The platform was purebred and competed for the PPL.

Proposals
João Goulart Filho advocated for increasing public investments, doubling the minimum wage in up to 4 years, was opposed to privatization, labor and social security reforms.

Motto
João Goulart Filho's campaign motto was "Who likes Brazil votes for him".

Election result

Presidential elections

See also

 Ciro Gomes 2018 presidential campaign
 Fernando Haddad 2018 presidential campaign
 Geraldo Alckmin 2018 presidential campaign
 Guilherme Boulos 2018 presidential campaign
 Jair Bolsonaro 2018 presidential campaign
 João Amoêdo 2018 presidential campaign

References

Notes 
1. Purebred plate is one formed by members of the same party.

2018 Brazilian presidential campaigns
2018 presidential campaigns